Clara Lou "Ann" Sheridan (February 21, 1915 – January 21, 1967) was an American actress and singer. She is best known for her roles in the films San Quentin (1937) with Humphrey Bogart, Angels with Dirty Faces (1938) with James Cagney and Bogart, They Drive by Night (1940) with George Raft and Bogart, City for Conquest (1940) with Cagney and Elia Kazan, The Man Who Came to Dinner (1942) with Bette Davis, Kings Row (1942) with Ronald Reagan, Nora Prentiss (1947), and I Was a Male War Bride (1949) with Cary Grant.

Early life 
Clara Lou Sheridan was born in Denton, Texas, on February 21, 1915, the youngest of five children (Kitty, Pauline, Mabel and George) of garage mechanic George W. Sheridan and Lula Stewart (née Warren). According to Sheridan, her father was a grandnephew of Civil War Union general Philip Sheridan.

She was active in dramatics at Denton High School and at North Texas State Teachers College. She also sang with the college's stage band and played basketball on the North Texas women's basketball team. Then, in 1933, Sheridan won the prize of a bit part in an upcoming Paramount film, Search for Beauty, when her sister Kitty entered Sheridan's photograph into a beauty contest.

Career

Paramount
After the release of Search for Beauty in 1934, Paramount put the 19-year-old under contract at a starting salary of $75 a week ($ today), where she played mostly uncredited bit parts for the next two years. She can be glimpsed in the following 1934 films, and if credited, as Clara Lou Sheridan: Bolero, Come On Marines!, Murder at the Vanities, Shoot the Works, Kiss and Make-Up with Cary Grant, The Notorious Sophie Lang, College Rhythm (directed by Norman Taurog whom Sheridan admired), Ladies Should Listen with Cary Grant, You Belong to Me, Wagon Wheels, The Lemon Drop Kid with Lee Tracy, Mrs. Wiggs of the Cabbage Patch, Ready for Love, Limehouse Blues with George Raft and Anna May Wong, and One Hour Late.

Along with fellow contractees, Sheridan worked with Paramount's drama coach Nina Mouise and performed on the studio lot in such plays as The Milky Way and The Pursuit of Happiness. While in The Milky Way, Paramount decided to change her first name from Clara Lou to the same as her character Ann.

Sheridan was then cast in the film Behold My Wife! (1934) at the behest of director and friend Mitchell Leisen. The role provided two standout scenes for the actress, including one in which her character commits suicide, to which she attributed Paramount's keeping her under contract.

She continued with bit parts in Enter Madame (1935) with Elissa Landi and Cary Grant, Home on the Range (1935) with Randolph Scott and Evelyn Brent, and Rumba (1935) with George Raft and Carole Lombard, until her first lead role in Car 99 (1935), with Fred MacMurray. "No acting, it was just playing the lead, that's all", she later said. She next had a support role as the romantic interest in Rocky Mountain Mystery (1935), a Randolph Scott Western. 

She then appeared in Mississippi (1935) with Bing Crosby and W. C. Fields, The Glass Key (1935) with George Raft in a brief speaking role for which she was billed as "Nurse" in the cast list at the end of the film, and (having one line) The Crusades (1935) with Loretta Young. In her last picture under her deal with Paramount, the studio loaned her out to Poverty Row production company Talisman to make The Red Blood of Courage (1935) with Kermit Maynard. After this, Paramount declined to renew her contract. Sheridan made Fighting Youth (1935) at Universal and then signed a contract with Warner Bros. in 1936.

Warner Bros.

Sheridan's career prospects began to improve at her new studio. Her early films for Warner Bros. included Sing Me a Love Song (1936); Black Legion (1937) with Humphrey Bogart; The Great O'Malley (1937) with Pat O'Brien and Bogart, her first real break; San Quentin (1937), with O'Brien and Bogart, singing for the first time in a film; and Wine, Women and Horses (1937) with Barton MacLane.

Sheridan moved into B picture leads: The Footloose Heiress (1937); Alcatraz Island (1937) with John Litel; and She Loved a Fireman (1937) with Dick Foran for director John Farrow. She was a lead in The Patient in Room 18 (1937) and its sequel Mystery House (1938). Sheridan was in Little Miss Thoroughbred (1938) with Litel for Farrow and supported Dick Powell in Cowboy from Brooklyn (1938).

Universal borrowed her for a support role in Letter of Introduction (1938) at the behest of director John M. Stahl. For Farrow, she was in Broadway Musketeers (1938), a remake of Three on a Match (1932).

Sheridan's notices in Letter of Introduction impressed Warner Bros. executives and she began to get roles in better quality pictures at her own studio starting with Angels with Dirty Faces (1938), wherein she played James Cagney's love interest; Bogart, O'Brien and the Dead End Kids had supporting roles. The film was a big hit and critically acclaimed.

Sheridan was reunited with the Dead End Kids in They Made Me a Criminal (1938) starring John Garfield. She was third-billed in the Western Dodge City (1939), playing a saloon owner opposite Errol Flynn and Olivia de Havilland. The film was another success.

Oomph girl

In March 1939, Warner Bros. announced Sheridan had been voted by a committee of 25 men as the actress with the most "oomph" in America. "Oomph" was described as "a certain indefinable something that commands male interest". 

She received as many as 250 marriage proposals from fans in a single week. Sheridan reportedly loathed the sobriquet that made her a popular pin-up girl in the early 1940s. However, she expressed in a February 25, 1940, news story distributed by the Associated Press that she no longer "bemoaned the "oomph" tag." She continued, "But I'm sorry now. I know if it hadn't been for "oomph" I'd probably still be in the chorus."

This was later referenced and spoofed on the 1941 animated short Hollywood Steps Out.

Stardom
Sheridan co-starred with Dick Powell in Naughty but Nice (1939) and played a wacky heiress in Winter Carnival (1939).

She was top billed in Indianapolis Speedway (1939) with O'Brien and Angels Wash Their Faces (1939) with the Dead End Kids and Ronald Reagan. Castle on the Hudson (1940) put her opposite Garfield and O'Brien.

Sheridan's first real starring vehicle was It All Came True (1940), a musical comedy costarring Bogart and Jeffrey Lynn. She introduced the song "Angel in Disguise".

Sheridan and Cagney were reunited in Torrid Zone (1940) with O'Brien in support. She was with George Raft, Bogart and Ida Lupino in They Drive by Night (1940), a smash-hit trucking melodrama. Sheridan was back with Cagney for City for Conquest (1941) and then made Honeymoon for Three (1941), a comedy with George Brent.

Sheridan did two lighter films: Navy Blues (1941), a musical comedy, and The Man Who Came to Dinner (1942) with Bette Davis, wherein she played a character modeled on Gertrude Lawrence. She then made Kings Row (1942), in which she received top billing playing opposite Ronald Reagan, Robert Cummings, and Betty Field. It was a major success and one of Sheridan's most memorable films.

Sheridan and Reagan were reunited for Juke Girl (1942) released about six weeks after Kings Row. She was in the war film Wings for the Eagle (1942) and made a comedy with Jack Benny, George Washington Slept Here (1943). She played a Norwegian resistance fighter in Edge of Darkness (1943) with Errol Flynn and was one of the many Warner Bros., stars who had cameos in Thank Your Lucky Stars (1943).

She was the heroine of a novel, Ann Sheridan and the Sign of the Sphinx, written by Kathryn Heisenfelt and published by Whitman Publishing Company in 1943. While the heroine of the story was identified as a famous actress, the stories were entirely fictitious. The story was probably written for a young teenaged audience and is reminiscent of the adventures of Nancy Drew. It is part of a series known as "Whitman Authorized Editions", 16 books published between 1941 and 1947 that always featured a film actress as heroine.

Sheridan was given the lead in the musical Shine On, Harvest Moon (1944), playing Nora Bayes, opposite Dennis Morgan. She was in a comedy The Doughgirls (1944).

Sheridan was absent from screens for over a year, touring with the USO to perform in front of the troops as far afield as China. She returned in One More Tomorrow (1946) with Morgan. She had an excellent role in the noir Nora Prentiss (1947), which was a hit. It was followed by The Unfaithful (1948), a remake of The Letter, and Silver River (1948), a Western melodrama with Errol Flynn.

Leo McCarey borrowed her to support Gary Cooper in Good Sam (1948). She was meant to star in Flamingo Road. She then left Warner Bros., saying: "I wasn't at all satisfied with the scripts they offered me."

Freelance star
Her role in I Was a Male War Bride (1949), directed by Howard Hawks and starring Cary Grant, was another success. In 1950, she appeared on the ABC musical television series Stop the Music.

She made Stella (1950), a comedy with Victor Mature at Fox.

In April 1949, she announced she wanted to produce Second Lady, a film based on a story by Eleanore Griffin. She was going to make Carriage Entrance at RKO. They fired her and Sheridan sued for $250,000 (equivalent to $ million today) The New York Times reported the amount as $350,000 ($ million today). Sheridan ultimately won $55,162 ($ today).

Universal
Sheridan made Woman on the Run (1950), a noir also starring Dennis O'Keefe which she produced. She wanted to make a film called Her Secret Diary.

Woman on the Run was distributed by Universal, and Sheridan signed a contract with that studio. While there, she made Steel Town (1952), Just Across the Street (1952), and Take Me to Town (1953), a comedy with Sterling Hayden that was the first film directed by Douglas Sirk in the United States.

Later career

Sheridan starred with Glenn Ford in Appointment in Honduras (1953), directed by Jacques Tourneur. She appeared opposite Steve Cochran in Come Next Spring (1956) and was one of several stars in MGM's The Opposite Sex (1956), a remake of The Women starring June Allyson, Joan Collins, Dolores Gray, Sheridan and Ann Miller. Her last film, Woman and the Hunter (1957), was shot in Africa.

She performed in stage tours of Kind Sir (1958) and Odd Man In (1959), and The Time of Your Life at the Brussels World Fair in 1958. In all three shows, she acted with Scott McKay, whom she later married.

In 1962, she played the lead in the Western series Wagon Train episode entitled "The Mavis Grant Story".

In the mid-1960s, Sheridan appeared on the NBC soap opera Another World.

Her final role was as Henrietta Hanks in the television comedy Western series Pistols 'n' Petticoats, which was filmed while she became increasingly ill in 1966, and was broadcast on CBS on Saturday nights. The 19th episode of the series, "Beware the Hangman", aired as scheduled on the same day that she died in 1967.

For her contributions to the motion picture industry, Ann Sheridan has a star on the Hollywood Walk of Fame at 7024 Hollywood Boulevard.

Personal life 
Sheridan married actor Edward Norris August 16, 1936, in Ensenada, Mexico. They separated a year later and divorced in 1939. On January 5, 1942, she married fellow Warner Bros. star George Brent, who co-starred with her in Honeymoon for Three (1941); they divorced exactly one year later. Following her divorce from Brent, she had a long-term relationship with publicist Steve Hannagan that lasted until his death in 1953. Hannagan bequeathed Sheridan $218,399 (equivalent to $ million today). 

Sheridan engaged in a romantic affair with Mexican actor Rodolfo Acosta, with whom she appeared in 1953's Appointment in Honduras.  She and the married Acosta shared an apartment in Mexico City for several years, and Sheridan was charged with criminal adultery in Mexican federal court in October, 1956, following an accusation by Acosta's wife, Jeanine Cohen Acosta.  Mexican authorities issued a warrant for Sheridan's arrest.<ref>"Actress Named in Adultery Action," San Pedro News-Pilot, November 1, 1956, p. 1.</ref>  Nothing came of the criminal charges, and the relationship ended c. 1958.

On June 5, 1966, Sheridan married actor Scott McKay, who was with her when she died, seven months later.

Sheridan supported Thomas E. Dewey in the 1948 presidential elections.

Death
In 1966, Sheridan began starring in a new television series, a Western-themed comedy called Pistols 'n' Petticoats''. She became ill during the filming and died of esophageal cancer with massive liver metastases at age 51 on January 21, 1967, in Los Angeles. She was cremated and her ashes were stored at the Chapel of the Pines Crematory in Los Angeles until they were interred in a niche in the Chapel Columbarium at the Hollywood Forever Cemetery in 2005.

Filmography

Radio appearances

References

External links

 
 
 
 
 Digital scrapbook filled with news clippings related to the career of Ann Sheridan, housed at the University of North Texas.
 Interview with Ann Sheridan biographer
 Photographs and literature

1915 births
1967 deaths
20th-century American actresses
Actresses from Texas
American film actresses
American television actresses
Burials at Chapel of the Pines Crematory
Burials at Hollywood Forever Cemetery
Deaths from cancer in California
Deaths from esophageal cancer
Deaths from liver cancer
Paramount Pictures contract players
People from Denton, Texas
University of North Texas alumni
Warner Bros. contract players
California Republicans
Texas Republicans